Johannes Joseph van der Velden (7 August 1891 – 19 May 1954) was a Catholic theologian and Bishop of Aachen.

He presided over the Diocese of Aachen from 7 September 1943 until his death. In 1944, he advised the Allied authorities on the selection of Franz Oppenhoff, who was subsequently installed as Mayor of Aachen.

References

Roman Catholic bishops of Aachen
20th-century German Roman Catholic bishops
Knights Commander of the Order of Merit of the Federal Republic of Germany
1891 births
1954 deaths
20th-century German Roman Catholic priests